Leonard Davis may refer to:

Leonard Davis (American football) (born 1978), American football offensive lineman, 2000–2012
Leonard Davis (judge) (born 1948), American district court judge in Texas
Leonard Davis (musician) (1905–1957), American jazz trumpeter
Leonard Davis Institute of Health Economics, University of Pennsylvania
Leonard Davis School of Gerontology